The Battle of Manimani was a failed American landing attempt west of Havana and was one of the final engagements of the Spanish–American War in Cuba.

Background
On July 23, 1898, Lieutenant John Heard anchored his force at the mouth of the Mani-Mani River and began unloading supplies intended for the Cuban insurgents operating in northwestern Cuba, unaware that the Spanish had discovered his presence and assembled a large force of cavalry in the environs.

Battle
Catching the Americans off guard, Spanish cavalry advanced out onto the beach and opened fire upon the landing parties. Heard ordered his men to take cover and return fire. Pounded by accurate American volleys, the Spanish withdrew back into the jungle.

Lieutenant Heard used the temporary respite to order an immediate retreat, evacuating his wounded into the USS Wanderer and preparing to lift anchor just as the Spaniards reappeared, unleashing a hail of fire at those on the deck.

Aftermath
For his remarkable calm and courage in the heat of battle at Manimani, John Heard was later awarded a Medal of Honor noting, "after two men had been shot down by Spaniards while transmitting orders to the engine-room on the Wanderer, the ship having become disabled, this officer took the position held by them and personally transmitted the orders, remaining at his post until the ship was out of danger." Due to the fact while transmitting orders they suicided to the wreckage and jumped off.

References 

Battles of the Spanish–American War
Battles involving Cuba
Battle of Rio Manimani
Conflicts in 1898
Battle of Rio Manimani
Battle of Rio Manimani